Marucci Sports is an American sports equipment manufacturing company based in Baton Rouge, Louisiana. Marucci focuses on baseball equipment, specifically producing bats, balls, gloves, batting gloves, batting helmets, and chest protectors.

Marucci's bats were the most used in the MLB, with more than 40% of players. In 2020, the company was acquired by investment firm Compass Diversified Holdings.

History 
Jack Marucci, LSU athletic trainer, built his first baseball bat after he unsuccessfully tried to find a suitable one for his son Gino. The bat-making was just a hobby until Marucci associated with two MLB players, Kurt Ainsworth and Joe Lawrence. Ainsworth began recommending Marucci's bat to other players, and in 2009 he became one of Marucci's co-founders.

As of 2013, Marucci bats were used by one-third of Major League Baseball players, like David Ortiz, José Bautista, Albert Pujols, Chase Utley, Anthony Rizzo, Giancarlo Stanton, and Bryce Harper. In a relatively short period of time, Marucci took a large share of the baseball bat market from longtime industry leader Louisville Slugger, with industry tracking publications validating #1 bat in the majors since 2013 by a wide margin.

While in 2006 Marucci supplied 4% of MLB players, by 2016 the company supplied 40%, with about 400-500 bats made a day.

In 2020, Marucci Sports was acquired by American investment group Compass Diversified Holdings for USD 200 million.

They have made bats known as the Cat 6, Cat 7, Cat 8, Cat 8 Connect, Cat 9, Cat 9 Connect, and Cat 9 composite for USSSA baseball and BBCOR baseball. They have also made the Marucci F5, Marruci Cat, and Marucci Cat Connect for USA baseball which is mainly used in little league.

Sponsorships

Players 

 Jose Abreu
 Ozzie Albies
 Albert Almora
 Austin Barnes
 José Bautista - JB19/JoeyBats19 bat model
 Carlos Beltrán - CB15 model
 Adrián Beltré
 Jackie Bradley Jr.
 Michael Brantley
 Alex Bregman
 Kris Bryant - KB17
 Lorenzo Cain
 Robinson Cano
 Matt Carpenter
 Sean Casey - SC21
 Starlin Castro
 Michael Conforto
 Carlos Correa - CC14
 Shin-Soo Choo
 Nelson Cruz
 Daniel Descalso
 Ian Desmond
 Corey Dickerson
 Josh Donaldson - Bringer of Rain Pro/Youth models
 Edwin Encarnación
 Wilmer Flores
 Todd Frazier
 Freddie Freeman
 David Freese
 Evan Gattis
 Ryan Goins
 Carlos González
 Jedd Gyorko
 Bryce Harper
 Cole Hamels
 Chase Headley
 Adeiny Hechavarria
 Todd Helton - TH17
 Aaron Hill
 Brock Holt
 Ryan Howard - RH6
 Chris Iannetta
 Jose Iglesias
 John Jaso
 Jon Jay
 Jung Ho Kang
 Clayton Kershaw
 Kevin Kiermaier
 Francisco Lindor - LINDY12
 Paul Lo Duca - PL16
 Manny Machado - MR21M
 Mikie Mahtook
 Jake Marisnick
 Carlos Martinez
 Andrew McCutchen - Cutch22/AM22
 Jordy Mercer
 Yadier Molina
 Yoan Moncada
 Mike Napoli
 Eduardo Nunez
 David Ortiz - DO34/Papi34
 Dustin Pedroia
 Cliff Pennington
 Steve Pearce
 Kevin Pillar
 Buster Posey - POSEY28
 Martin Prado
 Albert Pujols - AP5
 Jose Ramirez
 Manny Ramírez - MR24
 Anthony Rendon
 Édgar Rentería
 José Reyes - JR7
 Anthony Rizzo - Rizz44
 Carlos Santana
 Jonathan Schoop - M318-M
 Corey Seager
 Marcus Semien
 Gary Sheffield
 Giancarlo Stanton - G27-M
 Eugenio Suarez
 Yasmany Tomas
 Trea Turner
 Chase Utley - CU26
 Luis Valbuena
 Jonathan Villar
 Vernon Wells - VW10
 Nick Williams
 Julio Rodriguez

References

 LSU article about Marucci Bat Company
 Podcast from Louisiana Public Broadcasting about Marucci Bat Company
 Sports Illustrated article on Marucci

External links
 

Baseball bats
Sporting goods manufacturers of the United States
Manufacturing companies based in Louisiana
Companies based in Baton Rouge, Louisiana